The Bartonsville Covered Bridge is a wooden covered bridge in the village of Bartonsville, in Rockingham, Vermont, United States.  The bridge is a lattice truss style with a 151-foot span, carrying Lower Bartonsville Road over the Williams River.  It was built in 2012, replacing a similar bridge built in 1870 by Sanford Granger.  The 1870 bridge, which was listed on the National Register of Historic Places, was destroyed in 2011 in flooding caused by Hurricane Irene.

History
The bridge was built after the great flood of 1869 that changed the course of the river, replacing another covered bridge about 1/4 mile up the road where the river used to flow.  The bridge is listed on the National Register of Historic Places.

It was located on Lower Bartonsville Road, a paved road a short distance north from Vermont Route 103. Nearby, to the east, is the Worrall Covered Bridge, also built by Granger.

In the 1960s, a Town of Rockingham gravel truck fell through the bridge cutting off cars from Lower Bartonsville Village from the direct link to Vermont Route 103 until the floor was replaced. In the early 1980s extensive renovations were conducted on the bridge, including replacing the abutment on the north side of the bridge, reinforcing the original stone abutments on the south side of the bridge, and replacing the roof and the weathered siding.

Destruction by Hurricane Irene and replacement
On August 28, 2011, the bridge was destroyed by flash flooding caused by excessive rainfall from Hurricane Irene's landfall on the U.S. East Coast. An effort to
rebuild the structure was supported by town officials, who voted to use the bridge's insurance money to build another covered bridge.

The new bridge was opened on January 26, 2013.

See also
National Register of Historic Places listings in Windham County, Vermont
List of bridges on the National Register of Historic Places in Vermont
List of Vermont covered bridges
Old Blenheim Bridge, a covered bridge in upstate New York, also destroyed by Tropical Storm Irene; rebuilt in 2017

References

Covered bridges on the National Register of Historic Places in Vermont
Covered bridges in Windham County, Vermont
Buildings and structures in Rockingham, Vermont
Bridge disasters in the United States
Bridges completed in 1871
Bridges completed in 2012
Wooden bridges in Vermont
Former road bridges in the United States
Transportation disasters in Vermont
National Register of Historic Places in Windham County, Vermont
Buildings and structures demolished in 2011
Road bridges on the National Register of Historic Places in Vermont
Rebuilt buildings and structures in the United States
Lattice truss bridges in the United States
1871 establishments in Vermont
Buildings and structures destroyed by flooding